Nils Allègre (born 2 January 1994) is a World Cup alpine ski racer from France. He specializes in the speed events of Downhill and Super-G.

World Cup results

Season standings

Top ten finishes
0 podiums
7 top tens – (2 DH, 4 SG, 1 AC)

World Championship results

Olympic results

References

External links
 
 

1994 births
Living people
French male alpine skiers
Competitors at the 2015 Winter Universiade
Alpine skiers at the 2022 Winter Olympics
Olympic alpine skiers of France